A common phrase “”(場の空気を読む), “understanding the situation without words” or “sensing someone’s feelings”, is a very important concept for understanding Japanese culture. The literal meaning is “reading air”. Because of this cultural trait, many foreign visitors feel that Japanese are very kind and thoughtful towards them during their short stay in Japan.

Sensing and practicing “” is considered social manners or social intelligence in Japan.  Unlike the individualistic and expressive cultures in Western countries, people in Japan are expected to think collectively, understand situations without need for explanation and behave based on their position accordingly.  If you do not “read air” in business, you are not only unable to become a successful business person, but you will also find it hard to function as an employee in an organization.

Collective team work in rice farming and the islands’ geographical location may have developed “” culture in Japan. The ability of “Sensing someone’s feelings” generates thoughtfulness in Japanese culture and “understanding the situation without words” can contribute to build strong organizations in business.

See also
 Abilene paradox

References 

Japanese culture